The Al-Bass Tyre necropolis is a Lebanese UNESCO World Heritage site in the city of Tyre situated next to the el-Buss refugee camp. The necropolis, constituting the principal entrance of the town in antique times, is to be found on either side of a wide Roman and Byzantine avenue dominated by a triumphal arch of the 2nd century. Other important monumental vestiges of this archaeological area are an aqueduct, which carried water to the city, and a 2nd-century hippodrome.

The Roman and Byzantine necropolis 

Discovered in 1962, the necropolis consists of hundreds of stone and marble sarcophagi from the Roman and Byzantine eras. Several of them have Greek inscriptions or the names of those buried there, or their trade such as "wealthy purple dye manufacturer." Others whose sides and covers are decorated with frescoes and bas-reliefs of works from Homer and others.

The Triumphal Arch is one of the most impressive relics of the site. Fallen apart but reconstructed in modern times, it dominates the well preserved  Roman avenue which has a necropolis on either side scattered with hundreds of ornate stones and sculptured marble sarcophagi dating from the 2nd through the 6th century CE.

The Phoenician necropolis 
In the northern section of the site there is a Phoenician necropolis of the ninth century BCE formed by dug graves containing urns.

Conservation of the site 
Hostilities during 2006 threatened the site when a nearby building was bombarded.  A post-conflict analysis by conservation experts found that many of the frescoes had sustained damage.  This, combined with the significant lack of maintenance at the site, represents significant threats to the site.

The site was already plundered in the 1990s. Find disappeared in the illegal antiquities market and some obelisks are now displayed at Nabu museum in  El-Heri

References 

Buildings and structures completed in the 9th century BC
1962 archaeological discoveries
Tyre, Lebanon
Roman sites in Lebanon
Archaeological sites in Lebanon
Ancient cemeteries in Lebanon
Phoenician funerary practices
Necropoleis
Byzantine sites in Asia